Tuvalu House is the honorary consulate of the Government of Tuvalu in the Wimbledon area of London, England.

Since independence in 1978, Tuvalu has been a Commonwealth realm, with the Governor-General of Tuvalu representing His Majesty the King in Tuvalu. Based from Tuvalu House, Sir Iftikhar A. Ayaz has represented the Government of Tuvalu in London in recent years at a consular level.

Since the Government of Tuvalu does not have a large, organized consular or diplomatic service, it has generally preferred to engage in ad hoc trade or political missions, where the need arises. Other than Tuvalu's High Commission in Fiji, and other contacts in the Pacific region, Tuvalu House is thus somewhat of an exception as an overseas office representing Tuvalu.

While Tuvalu's commercial relations with the United Kingdom are limited, reflecting both the smallness of the country's economy and the geographical distance of Tuvalu from the UK, an updated information link is maintained with the British Chambers of Commerce (see link, below), and Tuvalu House advises further on commercial relations.

Tuvalu House is the closest thing to a High Commission that Tuvalu has in the United Kingdom.

See also 

 Foreign relations of Tuvalu

References 

Tuvalu
London
Tuvalu–United Kingdom relations
Tuvalu and the Commonwealth of Nations
United Kingdom and the Commonwealth of Nations